State Road 997, Route 997, or Highway 997, may refer to:

United States